is located on Hateruma island in Taketomi, Yaeyama District, Okinawa Prefecture, Japan. The prefecture operates the airport, which is classified as a third class airport.

Gallery

References

External links
 Hateruma Airport
 

Airports in Okinawa